The Chinese People's Police University is an academy in Langfang, Hebei, China which trains People's Police Force officers. The old name is Chinese People's Armed Police Force Academy.

External links
Official Website

Universities and colleges in Hebei
Law enforcement in China
Police academies in China